ʿAbd al-Jabbar ibn Ahmad ibn ʿAbd al-Jabbar al-Hamadani al-Asadabadi, Abu ʿl-Hasan (935 – 1025) was a Mu'tazilite theologian, and a reported follower of the Shafi‘i school. Abd al-Jabbar means "servant of the powerful." He was born in Asadabad near Hamadan, Iran. He settled in Baghdad, until he was invited to Rey in 367 AH/978 CE by its governor, Sahib ibn Abbad, a staunch supporter of the Mu'tazila theological movement . He was appointed chief Qadi of the province. On the death of ibn 'Abbad in 995 CE, Abd al-Jabbar was deposed and arrested by the Buyid Amir, Fakhr al-Dawla, because of a slighting remark made by him about his deceased benefactor. He died later in 415 AH/1025 CE.

His comprehensive "summa" of speculative theology, the Mughni, presented Mu`tazili thought under the two headings of God's oneness (tawhid) and his justice (adl). He argued that the Ash'arite separation between the eternal speech of God and the created words of the Qur'an made God's will unknowable.

He and his Mu’tazilite circle were contemporaries of Ibn Sina, better known in the West as Avicenna.

Works
He was the author of more than 70 books.

 Kitāb Al-Mughnī Fī Abwāb Al-Tawḥīd wa Al-'Adl ( المغني في أبواب التوحيد والعدل )
 Sharḥ to Ibn Khallād's Kitāb al-Uṣūl (which is lost)
 Sharḥ al-Uṣūl al-Khamsa (شرح الاصول الخمسة) ('The Explication of the Five Principles'). (While this is lost, this book received commentaries by two Zaydi authors, which have survived.)

Tathbit Dala’il
Abd Al-Jabbar produced an anti-Christian polemic text Tathbit Dala’il Nubuwwat Sayyidina Muhammad, (‘The Establishment of Proofs for the Prophethood of Our Master Mohammed’).

English translations
 Critique of Christian Origins: a parallel English-Arabic text, edited, translated, and annotated by Gabriel Said Reynolds and Samir Khalil Samir, Provo, Utah: Brigham Young University Press, 2010.

Notes

References

External links
 

935 births
1025 deaths
Mu'tazilites
Shafi'is
10th-century Muslim scholars of Islam
People from Hamadan Province
10th-century jurists
11th-century jurists